Lotis can refer to:
Lotis (mythology), a nymph in Greek mythology
Lotis (beetle), a genus of beetles
Large Optical Test and Integration Site, at the Lockheed Martin Space Systems Company in Sunnyvale, CA
Livermore Optical Transient Imaging System, an automated telescope for follow-up of gamma ray bursts
LOTIS committee, the Liberalisation of Trade in Services Committee, a working group within TheCityUK, United Kingdom
429 Lotis, a main belt asteroid

People with the name
Lotis Key, former Filipino-American professional film and theater actress
Dennis Lotis (1925–2023), South African-born British singer, actor, and entertainer